The 2022 Breeders' Cup Challenge series was a series of horse races that provided the respective winners with an automatic "Win and You're In" berth in the 2022 Breeders' Cup, held on November 4 and 5. Races were chosen by the Breeders' Cup organization and included key races in the various Breeders' Cup divisions from around the world. The Breeders' Cup organization paid the Breeders' Cup entry fee for the challenge race winners, provided they had been nominated as foals. They also provided travel allowances for out of state competitors

Summary
The 2022 Breeders' Cup Challenge series consisted of 82 races from across the United States and 10 other countries, compared to 84 races in the 2021 series. The Breeders' Cup committee restructured the series to ensure there were qualifying races in the east, midwest and west of the United States for most of the divisions, plus international qualifiers mainly for the turf races. The following races were added: Grande Prêmio Brasil (Turf - International region), Beverly D. (Filly & Mare Turf - Midwest), Green Flash (Turf Sprint - West region), Miss Grillo (Juvenile Fillies - East region), Ack Ack (Dirt Mile - Midwest region) and Pilgrim (Juvenile Turf - East). The Fleur de Lis, Suburban, John Nerud, Personal Ensign, Iroquois, Pocohantas, Jockey Club Derby, Santa Anita Sprint Championship, Zenyatta and First Lady were removed from the series. The King's Stand Stakes replaced the Diamond Jubilee Stakes as an international qualifier for the Turf Sprint.

NBC broadcast many of the North American challenge races, either on the main network or CNBC, with other races webcast on the Peacock.

Up to 14 horses are eligible for each Breeders' Cup race (12 for the Juvenile Turf Sprint and Dirt Mile). If a race is over-subscribed, first preference is given to winners of the Challenge series races. On October 26, 205 horses were pre-entered for the Breeders' Cup, 46 of which qualified via the Challenge series. The following fields were over-subscribed: Juvenile Turf Sprint, Juvenile Fillies, Juvenile Fillies Turf, Juvenile Turf, Filly & Mare Sprint, Turf Sprint, Dirt Mile, Filly & Mare Turf, Sprint, Mile and Turf.

Seven challenge race winners went on to win at the Breeders' Cup:
 Wonder Wheel automatically qualified in the Alcibiades, then won the Juvenile Fillies
 Forte won the Juvenile after qualifying in the Breeders' Futurity
 Goodnight Olive won the Filly & Mare Sprint after qualifying in the Ballerina Stakes
 Elite Power earned his automatic berth in the Vosburgh Stakes, then won the Sprint
 Modern Games won the Mile after automatically qualifying in the Woodbine Mile
 Malathaat won the Distaff after automatically qualifying in the Spinster Stakes
 Flightline automatically qualified by winning the Pacific Classic, then won the Classic. He also won the Metropolitan Handicap, which would have qualified him for the Dirt Mile

Challenge Series races
The following table shows the Breeders' Cup Challenge races for 2022 and respective winners. The "status" column shows whether the Challenge race winner was entered at the Breeders' Cup, and if so if they finished in the money.

References

Breeders' Cup Challenge
Breeders' Cup Challenge series
Breeders' Cup
Breeders' Cup Challenge